Biker Mice from Mars is an American science fiction action animated series created by Rick Ungar. The series premiered in syndication the week of September 19, 1993. It consists of three seasons of 65 episodes, with the final episode airing in syndication the week of February 24, 1996. A 2006 revival series based on the original was also produced, consisting of one season of 28 episodes.

Series overview

Episodes

Season 1 (1993)

Season 2 (1994–95)

Season 3 (1995–96)

References

External links 
 
 

Lists of American children's animated television series episodes
Lists of American science fiction television series episodes
Mars in television